Jizhou North railway station is a railway station located in Jizhou District, Tianjin, China. It is the northern terminus of the Tianjin–Jizhou railway and is also connected to the Beijing–Harbin railway via a branch.

History
From 30 April 2015, the service level was increased from one departure per day to six with the introduction of commuter trains to the Tianjin–Jizhou railway. Two daily departures to Beijing East railway station were introduced on 10 July 2015.

On 1 December 2018, the name of this station was changed from Jizhou to Jizhou North. At the same time, Jizhou South railway station was renamed Jizhou.

References 
 

Railway stations in Tianjin